Branislav Milošević (Serbian Cyrillic: Бранислав Mилoшeвић; born 13 May 1988) is a Serbian football defender who plays for Proleter Novi Sad.

He previously played with Teleoptik, Javor, BSK Borča, and Rad.

References

External links

 Branislav Milošević Stats at Utakmica.rs

1988 births
Living people
Sportspeople from Valjevo
Serbian footballers
FK Teleoptik players
FK Javor Ivanjica players
FK BSK Borča players
FK Rad players
FK Proleter Novi Sad players
Serbian expatriate footballers
Serbian expatriate sportspeople in the Czech Republic
Serbian SuperLiga players
Czech First League players
FK Dukla Prague players
Expatriate footballers in the Czech Republic
Association football defenders